Agustina Gutiérrez Salazar (San Fernando, 1851 - Santiago, Chile, September 4, 1886) was a Chilean painter and draftsman. She was the first student of the Painting Academy and the first teacher of plastic arts in her country.

She obtained an important public recognition for her work as a portraitist of women of the high society of Valparaíso, according to what was reflected in the press of his time.

Family and studies 

She was the daughter of José Antonio Gutiérrez Gutiérrez, born in the city of San Fernando, in the province of Colchagua, in the middle of a middle-class family, where her artistic gifts stood out as a child.

At age 15 she moved to Santiago with his father. She joined the Painting Academy in 1866.

She is considered the first woman who drives feminine art. In 1869, she was appointed by Alejandro Ciccarelli and, therefore, by the state of Chile, professor of drawing at the Painting Academy; She was 18 years old. This fact made her the first drawing teacher in Chile, being one of the initiators of this discipline as a teacher in the state school.

Art

She was one of the pioneer women to participate in the Painting Salons of Santiago. His talent was highlighted by oil painting on canvas, mainly on motifs about mythological legends, animals, epic themes, still lifes, flowers and varied compositions.

He also stood out as a pencil portraitist. With this technique it is estimated that he made more than two thousand portraits on paper. Among these portraits, the ladies of Valparaíso stand out: Juana Vargas de Jara Quemada, Carmela Mena de Veras, Marcelina Vargas de Mena, Acasia Lazo de Undurraga and the Royal Lady of Azúa. The portraits received a psychological character and nuances. He made a profession of his artistic work, like any other of the students of the Academy, being a work that allowed him to have his income to cover his needs, which for his time, moved him away from the leisure pattern; This was socially linked to women. You could see the learning of art, also French and music, as complements of their high education and culture.

Thus, his work was a reflection of the Chilean social context, especially the portraits of ladies of the high society of the time. His five sisters also cultivated the painting.

In the inauguration speech of the Academy of Painting in the year of 1849, where Alejandro Ciccarelli pointed out that:

She in her art can also make references to Paula Aldunate Larraín (1834-1871) who she was a disciple of Mauricio Rugendas.

Death and legacy

Agustina Gutiérrez was a victim of pneumonia of 35 years old, dying from this cause on September 4, 1886.

In number 51 of the cultural newspaper called The Illustrated Workshop, it is said of her:

In the following paragraphs they indicate that:

José Miguel Blanco says about her:

Agustina Gutiérrez participated in a single collective exhibition, which was the first exhibition of the Fifth Normal of the National Association of Agriculture, in Santiago of Chile, in 1884.

Awards and distinctions

1884 Honorable Mention in Painting, Salon 1884, Santiago de Chile

See also
Aurora Mira Mena (1863 – 1939)
Magdalena Mira Mena (1859 – 1930)
Celia Castro (1860 – 1930)
Painting Academy (Chile)

References

1851 births
1886 deaths
People from San Fernando, Chile
19th-century Chilean painters
19th-century women artists
Chilean women painters